Frederick Albert Schmidt (February 9, 1916 – November 17, 2012) was an American pitcher in Major League Baseball who played for three different National League teams between 1944 and 1947. He was born in Hartford, Connecticut.

Schmidt entered the majors in 1944 with the St. Louis Cardinals, playing for them one year before joining military service during World War II. In his rookie season, Schmidt went 7–3 with a 3.15 earned run average, two shutouts, and five saves to help his team to clinch the National League pennant. He also pitched 3.1 scoreless innings of relief in Game 3 of the 1944 World Series, won by the Cardinals over the St. Louis Browns in six games.

After his discharge, Schmidt rejoined St. Louis in 1946 but he was not the same after that. He divided his playing time with the Cardinals, Phillies and Cubs in 1947, his last major league season.

In a three-season career, Schmidt posted a 13–11 record with 98 strikeouts and a 3.75 ERA in 85 appearances, including 15 starts, three complete games, two shutouts, five saves, and 225.1 innings.

Schmidt died on November 17, 2012.

At the time of his death, Schmidt (96) was recognized as the fourth oldest living major league ballplayer. From November 2011 until his death, he was the oldest to have played for a World Series–winning team. He was also the oldest living player for the Cardinals and Phillies.

References

External links

Baseball Page
Retrosheet

1916 births
2012 deaths
Abilene Blue Sox players
Albany Cardinals players
Allentown Wings players
United States Army personnel of World War II
Asheville Tourists players
Baseball players from Hartford, Connecticut
Brownsville Charros players
Chicago Cubs players
Dallas Eagles players
Los Angeles Angels (minor league) players
Major League Baseball pitchers
Martinsville Manufacturers players
Mobile Shippers players
Nashville Vols players
Philadelphia Phillies players
Portsmouth Red Birds players
Rochester Red Wings players
St. Louis Cardinals players
Seattle Rainiers players
Shelby Cardinals players
Springfield Cardinals players
Wichita Falls Spudders players